Linda Rybová (born 15 October 1975) is a Czech actress. She appeared in more than thirty films since 1989.

She voiced Sarah Angelo in the Czech dub of the 2002 action-adventure video game Mafia.

Selected filmography

References

External links
 

1975 births
Living people
Actresses from Prague
Czech film actresses
Czech video game actresses
21st-century Czech actresses